Ripley is an unincorporated community in Charles County, Maryland, United States.  It was named after a local family, and has a large Baptist church.

References

Unincorporated communities in Charles County, Maryland
Unincorporated communities in Maryland